The Crawford Purchase was an agreement that surrendered lands that extended west along the north shore of the  St. Lawrence River and Lake Ontario from the Mississaugas to the British crown to enable Loyalist settlement in what is now a part of eastern Ontario, Canada. The agreement was made in 1783 in exchange for various items.

Background

Land in the eastern region of what is now Ontario was being settled by Loyalists and their Native allies in 1783. This area was originally the domain of the Iroquois, but became occupied by the Mississaugas by 1700. An arrangement needed to be worked out with the Mississaugas before the land became organized for settlement.

Agreement

Frederick Haldimand, governor of the Province of Quebec instructed Sir John Johnson, Inspector General of Indian Affairs, to begin land purchase negotiations. Negotiations were led by Captain William Radford Crawford of the King's Royal Regiment of New York. The agreement was signed on 9 October 1783 on Carleton Island and gave the British title to "all the lands from the Toniata or Ongara River (now Jones Creek near Brockville) to a river in the Bay of Quinte within eight leagues to the bottom of the said Bay including all the islands extending from the lake as far back as a man can travail (sic) in a day". The actual extent comprised an area of land from near Gananoque to the Trent River and about 30 miles inland.

The Mississaugas received gifts which consisted of blankets, clothing, guns, ammunition, and "as much red cloth as would make a dozen coats and as many laced hats".

The Crawford Purchase was designated an Event of National Historic Significance on 17 May 1929.

See also
 Toronto Purchase
 John Ross (1744–1809)

References
Notes

Bibliography

 Mika, Nick and Helma et al. Kingston, Historic City. Belleville: Mika Publishing Co., 1987. .
Osborne, Brian S. and Donald Swainson. Kingston, Building on the Past for the Future. Quarry Heritage Books, 2011. 
  Crawford Purchase National Historic Event Retrieved 2015-09-11
 

1783 in Canada
Events of National Historic Significance (Canada)
Mississaugas